Jessica Lucy Sigsworth (born 13 October 1994) is an English footballer who plays as a striker for Leicester City in the FA Women's Super League. She previously played for Notts County, Doncaster Rovers Belles and Manchester United, and has represented England at numerous youth levels.

Sigsworth won the Golden Boot award for most goals scored during the 2017–18 FA WSL 2 season and the 2018–19 FA Women's Championship.

Early life
Sigsworth, aged seven, started her youth career playing for Branton Boys. Her twin brother played for Branton and the coach asked her if she wanted to play. After playing for Doncaster Rovers Belles Juniors, she moved to Sheffield United Girls’ Centre of Excellence, where she broke into the England under-17 squad. After three seasons, she returned to Doncaster Belles.

As a youth, Sigsworth was a fan of Manchester United and dreamed of playing for the club.

Club career

Doncaster Rovers Belles, 2011–15 

Sigsworth began her senior career by signing with Doncaster Rovers Belles in 2011. She made her senior debut on 23 July 2011 in a 3–0 defeat against Birmingham City. In four years, she scored seven goals in 41 appearances.

Notts County, 2015
In January 2015, Sigsworth moved to FA WSL outfit Notts County. Though she was named in a matchday squad twice, she never made an appearance.

Return to Doncaster Rovers Belles, 2016–18
In November 2015, Sigsworth re-signed with hometown team Doncaster Rovers Belles ahead of the 2016 season. On 20 March 2016, she scored her first goal, in her first appearance since returning to the club in a 4–1 defeat against Chelsea in the FA Women's Cup. In May 2016, she signed a full-time contract. In August, she suffered a cruciate knee ligament injury, missing the rest of the season, as the team were relegated to FA WSL 2, as well as the subsequent Spring Series. In the 2017–18 season, Sigsworth won the FA WSL 2 Player of the Month award for March. Sigsworth guided Doncaster to the FA WSL 2 title and won the golden boot with 15 goals.

Manchester United, 2018–21
 
In July 2018, Sigsworth was announced as part of the inaugural Manchester United squad that was set to compete in the newly restructured FA Women's Championship. She made her competitive debut for Manchester United in a 1–0 League Cup victory against Liverpool on 19 August. On the opening day of the 2018–19 Championship season, Sigsworth scored five goals in a 12–0 win away to Aston Villa. On 9 March 2019, during a 2–0 FA WSL Cup win against West Ham, Sigsworth was involved in an incident with Brooke Hendrix; three days later, Hendrix was charged with violent conduct by the FA and banned for three games. Sigsworth finished the season with consecutive Championship titles and golden boot awards, having scored 17 league goals.

Sigsworth scored her first goal of the 2019–20 season in United's 2–0 League Cup win against Manchester City on 20 October 2019. During a match against Reading on 27 October, her "cool, calm and collected" goal in the 85th minute secured the team's 2–0 win. She finished the regular season with two goals in 14 matches. Manchester United finished in fourth place with a  record.

Ahead of the 2020–21 season, Sigsworth signed a new one-year contract with an option for a further year. Of the signing, she said, "I love this club; as a kid growing up supporting United it was always a dream to be a part of its history." With a decrease in playing time for a second successive season, limited to 577 minutes in 14 league appearances, it was announced on 21 June 2021 that Sigsworth would leave United on the expiry of her contract at the end of the month. At the time, Sigsworth departed the club as the third highest goalscorer behind Ella Toone and Lauren James.

Leicester City, 2021–present
On 16 July 2021, Sigsworth signed for newly-promoted Leicester City ahead of their maiden FA WSL season. In February 2022, Sigsworth ruptured her ACL ending her season early.

International career
Sigsworth has represented England at under-17, under-19, under-20 and under-23 levels.

In April 2011, Sigsworth scored for the under-17s in a 1–0 win against Sweden in the UEFA European Women's Under-17 Championship second qualifying round. In August 2013, Sigsworth was part of the England under-19 team who finished as runners-up to France at the UEFA Women's Under-19 Championship in Wales. In July 2014, Sigsworth was named as part of the England under-20 squad for the FIFA U-20 Women's World Cup. Sigsworth started all three games as England failed to progress, having finished third in Group C.

Career statistics

Club
.

Honours
Doncaster Rovers Belles
 FA WSL 2: 2017–18

Manchester United
 FA Women's Championship: 2018–19

Individual
 FA WSL 2 / FA Women's Championship Golden Boot: 2017–18, 2018–19

See also
 List of Manchester United W.F.C. records and statistics
 List of Manchester United W.F.C. players

References

Further reading
 Aluko, Eniola (2019), They Don't Teach This, Random House, 
 Caudwell, Jayne (2013), Women's Football in the UK: Continuing with Gender Analyses, Taylor & Francis, 
 Grainey, Timothy (2012), Beyond Bend It Like Beckham: The Global Phenomenon of Women's Soccer, University of Nebraska Press,

External links

 Profile at the Manchester United F.C. website
 Profile at the Football Association website
 
 
 
 

Living people
1994 births
English women's footballers
Women's association football forwards
Women's association football midfielders
Women's Super League players
Notts County L.F.C. players
Doncaster Rovers Belles L.F.C. players
Manchester United W.F.C. players
Leicester City W.F.C. players
Footballers from Doncaster
England women's under-23 international footballers
Sheffield United W.F.C. players